Steven Andrew Patterson (born 3 October 1983) is a former English first class cricketer, who played for Yorkshire County Cricket Club.

A tall seam bowler and right hand lower order batsman, Patterson made his first-class debut in 2005 against Bangladesh A, having first played one-day cricket for his native county in 2002. Patterson attended Leeds University from 2002 to 2005, where he studied mathematics whilst playing part-time for Yorkshire County Cricket Club. Six first-class matches, up to the end of 2006, brought him 85 runs at 14.16, with a best score of 46 and two wickets.

Patterson secured a regular County Championship place in the side at the start of the 2010 season.

Patterson was appointed as captain of the side for the 2019 season, and continued in that role until 2022.  In September 2022 he announced his retirement.

References

External links
 

1983 births
Living people
Yorkshire cricketers
Cricketers from Beverley
English cricketers
Yorkshire Cricket Board cricketers
English cricketers of the 21st century